The Best FIFA Football Awards 2021 were held on 17 January 2022. The ceremony was held virtually due to the ongoing COVID-19 pandemic.

Winners and nominees

The Best FIFA Men's Player

Eleven players were initially shortlisted on 22 November 2021. The three finalists were revealed on 7 January 2022.

Robert Lewandowski won the award with 48 rank points, his second consecutive win.

The selection criteria for the men's players of the year was: respective achievements during the period from 8 October 2020 to 7 August 2021.

The Best FIFA Men's Goalkeeper

Five players were initially shortlisted on 22 November 2021. The three finalists were revealed on 5 January 2022.

Édouard Mendy won the award with 24 rank points.

The Best FIFA Men's Coach

Seven coaches were initially shortlisted on 22 November 2021. The three finalists were revealed on 6 January 2022.

Thomas Tuchel won the award with 28 rank points.

The Best FIFA Women's Player

Thirteen players were initially shortlisted on 22 November 2021. The three finalists were revealed on 7 January 2022.

Alexia Putellas won the award with 52 rank points.

The selection criteria for the women's players of the year was: respective achievements during the period from 8 October 2020 to 6 August 2021.

The Best FIFA Women's Goalkeeper

Five players were initially shortlisted on 22 November 2021. The three finalists were revealed on 5 January 2022.

Christiane Endler won the award with 26 rank points.

The Best FIFA Women's Coach

Five coaches were initially shortlisted on 22 November 2021. The three finalists were revealed on 6 January 2022.

Emma Hayes won the award with 22 rank points.

FIFA Puskás Award
 
The eleven players initially shortlisted for the award were announced on 29 November 2021. The three finalists were revealed on 4 January 2022. All goals up for consideration were scored from 8 October 2020 to 7 August 2021. Every registered FIFA.com user was allowed to participate in the final vote until 17 December 2021, with the questionnaire being presented on the official website of FIFA. The selected goals were also voted on by a panel of ten "FIFA experts". Both groups' votes weighed equally on the ultimate winner of the award.

Erik Lamela won the award with 22 rank points.

FIFA Fan Award

The award celebrates the best fan moments or gestures of October 2020 to August 2021, regardless of championship, gender or nationality. The shortlist was compiled by a panel of FIFA experts, and every registered FIFA.com user was allowed to participate in the final vote until 14 January 2022.

The three nominees were announced on 22 November 2021. Denmark and Finland fans won the award with over 100,000 registered votes.

FIFA Fair Play Award

The Best FIFA Special Award
An additional award was given out to Portugal's Cristiano Ronaldo and Canada's Christine Sinclair, to recognize them becoming the all-time leading international goalscorers in men and women's senior football, respectively.

FIFA FIFPRO Men's World 11

The 23–player men's shortlist was announced on 14 December 2021.

The players chosen were Gianluigi Donnarumma as goalkeeper, David Alaba, Leonardo Bonucci and Rúben Dias as defenders, Kevin De Bruyne, Jorginho and N'Golo Kanté as midfielders, and Erling Haaland, Robert Lewandowski, Lionel Messi and Cristiano Ronaldo as forwards.

 Other nominees

FIFA FIFPRO Women's World 11

The 23–player women's shortlist was announced on 14 December 2021.

The players chosen were Christiane Endler as goalkeeper, Millie Bright, Lucy Bronze, Magdalena Eriksson and Wendie Renard as defenders, Estefanía Banini, Barbara Bonansea and Carli Lloyd as midfielders, and Marta, Vivianne Miedema and Alex Morgan as forwards.

 Other nominees

Selection panels

Men's selection panel
The panel of experts who shortlisted the nominees for The Best FIFA Football Awards 2021 for the men's players and coaches comprised:

  Ali Al-Habsi
  Jared Borgetti
  Tim Cahill
  Júlio César
  Geremi
  Jürgen Klinsmann
  Alexi Lalas
  Javier Mascherano
  Ryan Nelsen
  David Trezeguet

Women's selection panel
The panel of experts who shortlisted the nominees for The Best FIFA Football Awards 2021 for the women's players and coaches comprised:

  Florence Adhiambo
  Margaret Aka
  Eniola Aluko
  Emma Byrne
  April Heinrichs
  Rosana
  Memunatu Sulemana
  Homare Sawa
  Marta Tejedor
  Chan Yuen Ting

References

External links
 Official website

2021
2021 in association football
2021 sports awards
Women's association football trophies and awards
2021 in women's association football